Nepal competed at the 2016 Winter Youth Olympics in Lillehammer, Norway from 12 to 21 February 2016.

Alpine skiing

Boys

See also
Nepal at the 2016 Summer Olympics

References

2016 in Nepalese sport
Nations at the 2016 Winter Youth Olympics
Nepal at the Youth Olympics